The 1933 All-Ireland Minor Football Championship was the fifth staging of the All-Ireland Minor Football Championship, the Gaelic Athletic Association's premier inter-county Gaelic football tournament for boys under the age of 18.

Kerry entered the championship as defending champions.

On 24 September 1933, Kerry won the championship following a 4-1 to 0-9 defeat of Mayo in the All-Ireland final. This was their third All-Ireland title overall and their third in succession.

Results

Connacht Minor Football Championship

Leinster Minor Football Championship

Munster Minor Football Championship

Ulster Minor Football Championship

All-Ireland Minor Football Championship

Semi-Finals

Final

References

1929
All-Ireland Minor Football Championship